Lowell Correctional Institution is a women's prison in unincorporated Marion County, Florida, north of Ocala, in the unincorporated area of Lowell. A part of the Florida Department of Corrections, it serves as the primary prison for women in the state. Almost 3,000 women are incarcerated in the complex, which includes the Lowell Annex. As of 2015 2,696 women are in the main Lowell CI, making it the largest prison for women in the United States; its prison population became larger than that of the Central California Women's Facility that year.

It opened in April 1956 as the Florida Correctional Institution and was the first Florida prison for women. It houses community, minimum, medium, and close custody inmates. At the time it was opened, Lowell was the only prison that housed solely female offenders in the state. 

In 1999, the name was changed to Lowell Correctional Institution/Women's Unit, and in 2000 it was given the latest title of Lowell Correctional Institution. It has a maximum population of 1,456 female inmates ranging anywhere from youth (14–18) to adults (18+).  The Annex has a maximum general population of 1,500 and another 150 special housing beds for close management, death row, medical isolation, and confinement. It has consistently been associated with inmate abuse, sexual abuse, inhumane conditions, and little to no intervention from the State of Florida (Miami Herald, 2015, 2017)The facility is currently under investigation for unsafe conditions with regards to the ongoing pandemic and nearly half of the inmates have tested positive as of September 11 2021 according to the Florida department of corrections (FDC, FDC Responds to COVID-19 at Lowell Correctional Institution). Inmates have taken to social media describing overcrowding, lack of medical care, and severe illness in some inmates.

Facilities 
Lowell Correctional Institution houses female offenders at all security levels, including juveniles age 14 to 18 and adults. The Lowell Annex, under the supervision of the Lowell Correctional Institution, houses an inmate reception center. It also houses close security and death row inmates. The Lowell Correctional Institution Work Camp houses inmates whose custody level allows them to work outside the gates and with the public. The Lowell Correctional Institution Boot "C.A.M.P." Jones (Correctional Alternative Military Program), is a boot camp for young offenders.  The C.A.M.P. Jones facility was defunded in 2011 along with several other facilities statewide.  The C.A.M.P. Jones program was moved to the Lowell Work Camp in an effort to continue to offer its rehabilitative benefits to those that qualify for the program.  Lowell's Main Unit currently hosts the E.D.P Program for offenders aged 14 to 21.

This camp provided labor for the Florida Division of Forestry, while it was in operation.

History 
Prior to the opening of the women's prison, female offenders in Florida were housed at the Florida State Prison, Raiford, in segregated units separate from the males. They were housed at the State Prison, Raiford in wooden dorms. The quarters were overcrowded and used double beds. Women worked in separate sections of the prison workshops and farms. The degree of segregation between males and females in comparison to other prisons was not possible. Facilities for black and white girls were also segregated. Black girls were housed at Raiford with adult offenders. White girls were held at The Industrial School for Girls in Ocala where Lowell Correctional Institution would later be established. The Industrial School for Girls provided institutional care for an average of 80 to 100 delinquent girls, mostly white. In April 1956, the first all female prison was opened in Lowell, as Florida Correctional Institution. All women at the state prison in Raiford were transferred to this facility. At that time the prison became the death row for women in Florida.

Growth 
The Forest Hills School for Girls, previously belonging to the Florida Department of Health and Rehabilitative Services, was added to Florida C.I. in 1973. The Levy Forestry Camp was added in 1995 with a primary mission of providing labor for the Division of Forestry. In July 1997, C.A.M.P. Jones was opened as the only "boot camp"- style program for young female offenders in Florida. In 1998, Florida C.I. was combined with Marion C.I., changing the name to Lowell C.I. / Women's Unit. Then in 2000, the prison was renamed Lowell C.I. and began housing youthful pregnant offenders.

At some point the Broward Correctional Institution housed female death row inmates. Lowell Annex opened in April 2002. The female death row was moved to Lowell Annex in February 2003.

In 2009, renovations of Lowell Correctional Institution started.  The first phase was completed and (2) 180-bed open bay dormitories were placed online in the Summer of 2009.  With the opening of these two dorm, several older dorms were taken out of service.  In the Fall of 2009, Phase Two began and several mission changes were put into effect, elderly inmates were moved to climate controlled dormitories at the Lowell Correctional Institution Annex and the primary dormitory where wheelchair-using inmates were housed was demolished to make way for a new food service and canteen buildings.  Another mission that has changed in 2009, is Lowell Correctional Institution's housing of Pregnant Inmates.  In 2009 the Department of Corrections completed a climate-controlled facility in South Florida to house long term pregnant inmates.  Inmates in the final term of their pregnancy will remain housed at Lowell Correctional Institution.  There are an additional (2) open bay dorms and (2) secure-cell housing units planned to begin in the final phase of the renovations.

In 2010, the Lowell Correctional Institution Annex completed a (1) 240-bed secure-cell housing unit.  This dormitory houses inmates that the department has classified as security risks and require housing in cells instead of dormitory bunks.

In 2012, Lowell Reception Center, was scheduled to be revealed.  This stand-alone facility will take over the Reception and Orientation mission from the Annex.  Also scheduled to be opened at the Lowell Reception Center is a Crisis Care/Transitional Care Unit that will house inmates that require inpatient mental health treatment. 
The projected inmate population once these units are complete will be approximately 4000 housed within the 6 units that Lowell Correctional Institution will encompass.

Miami Herald series and abuse allegations 
In 2015 the Miami Herald announced it was going to publish an investigative series, "Beyond Punishment," on Lowell CI, alleging misconduct. The newspaper published a short video with the same title. The FLDC criticized the newspaper, stating that it had worked with the newspaper previously. It provided a statement in advance to the newspaper.

In 2020 the United States Department of Justice stated that an investigation found that widespread victimization occurred at Lowell.

In August 2019, 52-year-old Cheryl Weimar was viciously beaten by correctional officers in an attack that left her a quadriplegic. She won a settlement for 4.65 million dollars and was granted conditional release. Captain Keith Mitchell Turner was later terminated from employment after being arrested on charges related to molesting two children, but not for his role in the attack. A second officer, Ryan Dionne, was allowed to resign after being implicated in the attack.

Tuberculosis outbreak
In July 2005, 3,100 prisoners and 800 staff members were tested at Lowell Correction Institution for tuberculosis. Prison officials confirmed seven cases and no fatalities. State and local officials were unsure how the infection was brought into the facility.

Notable inmates 
Dalia Dippolito - Serving 16 years for soliciting the murder of her husband, Michael Dippolito. 
Emilia Carr - Serving life without parole for the murder of Heather Strong.
Rachel Wade - Serving 27 years for the murder of Sarah Luderman.
Courtney Schulhoff - Serving 40 years for the murder of her father.
Jennifer Fichter - Former high school teacher serving 22 years for Sexual Battery against three of her high school students.
Jennifer Mee - Hiccup girl, serving life without parole.
Ashley McArthur - Serving a life sentence for the 1st degree murder of her friend, private investigator and former police officer, Taylor Wright.

On death row 
Tiffany Cole – Found guilty of kidnapping and first-degree murder of a St. Nicholas, Florida couple and was sentenced to death. Her co-conspirator, Michael Jackson, was also found guilty and sentenced to death.
Marie Dean Arrington – Murderer of Vivian Ritter and the second woman to be placed on the list of FBI Ten Most Wanted Fugitives.

References 

https://www.orlandosentinel.com/news/breaking-news/os-ne-florida-prisoner-cheryl-weimer-paralyzed-medical-release-20200910-p5cmx26ldfexvgfiuw436gcpne-story.html

Further reading
"Beyond Punishment." Miami Herald. 2015.

External links 
Lowell Correctional Institution 

1956 establishments in Florida
Women's prisons in Florida
Buildings and structures in Marion County, Florida
Prisons in Florida
Capital punishment in Florida